A Dream is a Question You Don't Know How to Answer is the debut studio album by Canadian recording artist Jonny Craig, released on August 18, 2009 via Rise Records.

Background
On July 13, Jonny Craig posted two songs from his solo album on his Myspace; "I Still Feel Her, Part III" and "Children of Divorce".

On July 16, Jonny Craig Posted 3rd song, Called '7 AM, 2 Bottles And The Wrong Road' from his solo album.

An update on the track listing on July 27 revealed that The Pain Loss did not make the final cut for the album.  The album leaked on August 13, 2009.

The album peaked at number 12 on the Billboard Top Heatseekers chart and 42 on the Top Independent Albums.

Recently, the music video for I Still Feel Her, Part III was released. It was filmed by producer Robby Starbuck. The music video features Pierce the Veil members Tony Perry on bass guitar and Mike Fuentes on drums. Also, Matt Mingus and Jon Mess from Dance Gavin Dance, and Tyler McElhaney and Noah Slifka from In Fear and Faith are featured as cameos.

On February 25, 2010 his music video for Children of Divorce was released. The video was filmed by producer Robby Starbuck.

Track listing

Personnel
As listed on the liner notes

Jonny Craig – vocals, piano
Kris Crummett – guitars, bass, drums, keyboards, producer, engineer, mixer, mastering
Stephan Hawkes – guitars
Jeff Bond – guitar on tracks 4, 7, 9, 10
Michael Barrett – guitar on track 3
Robbie Dressler – bass on tracks 2, 3, 9
Josh Northcutt – drums on tracks 2, 3, 4, 9
Allison Green – additional vocals on track 3
 Official site album artist Vasily Kafanov

The album artwork was done by Vasily Kafanov who also worked on The Smashing Pumpkins album Machina/The Machines of God, as well as every full length album by indie/post-hardcore band mewithoutYou.

Title
The title of the album is paraphrased from a quote said by Gillian Anderson as Dana Scully in an episode of The X-Files entitled "Paper Hearts". A nearly identical instance of this quote is spoken by David Duchovny as Fox Mulder in the episode "Aubrey".

Uses in other media
Rapper Bizzy Bone samples the main chorus of "I Still Feel Her Pt. 3" for the song "Bottled Up Like Smoke", featured on his studio album Crossroads: 2010.

References

2009 debut albums
Jonny Craig albums
Rise Records albums
Albums produced by Kris Crummett